Leonard Roberts (born November 17, 1972) is an American actor. He is best known for his roles as Sean Taylor in Drumline and for playing Forrest Gates in the fourth season of Buffy the Vampire Slayer and D. L. Hawkins in a recurring role on Heroes.

Early life
Roberts was born in St. Louis, Missouri. He graduated from University City High School in 1991 and in 1995, Roberts graduated from The Theatre School at DePaul University with a Bachelor of Fine Arts in acting.

Career
Roberts has portrayed roles such as Sean Taylor in Drumline and starred as Forrest Gates in the fourth season of Buffy the Vampire Slayer and D. L. Hawkins on the NBC science-fiction drama Heroes. He is also known among Smallville fans for playing the role of Nam-Ek. Roberts is credited with the role of Leo in the 2011 film, Pizza Man. He played a small role in season 1 of NCIS as a member of a navy base.

On December 17, 2020, Roberts wrote a piece for Variety discussing his tension with his co-star Ali Larter that resulted in his firing from Heroes.

Filmography

Film and TV Movies

Television

Web

Video games

References

External links 
 

1972 births
Living people
African-American male actors
American male film actors
American male stage actors
American male television actors
American male voice actors
20th-century American male actors
21st-century American male actors
DePaul University alumni
Male actors from St. Louis
20th-century African-American people
21st-century African-American people